684 Hildburg (prov. designation:  or ) is a stony background asteroid from the inner regions of the asteroid belt. It was discovered on 8 August 1909, by German astronomer August Kopff at the Heidelberg-Königstuhl State Observatory in southwest Germany. Any reference to the origin of the asteroid's name is unknown.

Orbit and classification 

Hildburg is a non-family asteroid of the main belt's background population when applying the hierarchical clustering method to its proper orbital elements. It orbits the Sun in the inner main-belt at a distance of 2.3–2.5 AU once every 3 years and 9 months (1,385 days; semi-major axis of 2.43 AU). Its orbit has an eccentricity of 0.04 and an inclination of 6° with respect to the ecliptic. The body's observation arc begins at Heidelberg Observatory on 19 August 1909, just eleven nights after its official discovery observation.

Naming 

This minor planet's name may have been inspired by the two letters of its provisional designation, "1909 HD". However, any reference to a person or occurrence is unknown. It is speculated that the name comes from a list created in 1913 by the Astronomisches Rechen-Institut (ARI) containing suggestions of female names from history and mythology for the naming of minor planets (AN 196, 137). At the time, the naming process was not well developed and the ARI feared inconsistencies and potential confusion. The list was sent to several German astronomers, including Kopff, with the invitation to name all of their made discoveries up to number 700. It is therefore unlikely that this asteroid's name refers to a known person such as Austrian actress  (1862–1942).

Unknown meaning 

Among the many thousands of named minor planets, Hildburg is one of 120 asteroids for which  has been published.

Physical characteristics 

Hildburg is a common stony S-type asteroid according to observations by Richard Binzel conducted at McDonald and Cerro Tololo observatories in May 1984.

Rotation period 

In March 2014, a rotational lightcurve of Hildburg was obtained from photometric observations by Italian astronomer Andrea Ferrero at the Bigmuskie Observatory  in Mombercelli, Italy. Lightcurve analysis gave a rotation period of  hours with a brightness variation of  magnitude. However, the result is ambiguous and allows for an alternative period solution of 11.92 hours. In April 2008, French amateur astronomer René Roy determined a period of  hours with a low amplitude of  magnitude.

Diameter and albedo 

The Collaborative Asteroid Lightcurve Link assumes a standard albedo for a stony asteroid of 0.20 and derives a diameter of 19.28 kilometers based on an absolute magnitude of 10.94. These timed observations are taken when the asteroid passes in front of a distant star.

References

External links 
 Lightcurve Database Query (LCDB), at www.minorplanet.info
 Dictionary of Minor Planet Names, Google books
 Asteroids and comets rotation curves, CdR – Geneva Observatory, Raoul Behrend
 Discovery Circumstances: Numbered Minor Planets (1)-(5000) – Minor Planet Center
 
 

000684
Discoveries by August Kopff
Named minor planets
19090808